Mrs. International may refer to:

"Mrs. International" (song), by Method Man & Redman, 2009
Mrs. International, a beauty pageant

See also
Ms. International, a female bodybuilding contest 
Ms. International (pageant), part of the Ms. America Pageant Inc. system